Josephine James is a Grammy-nominated singer, songwriter, and recording artist. James is best known for her performances on Burt Bacharach’s world tours, such as her feature song “Anyone Who Had a Heart". James is also the lead vocalist of George Duke, the band. James' co-wrote her solo albums Candles, Songcity, Hit Factory, and That Jazz with producer Nigel Martinez. James and Martinez also collaborated to release several UK singles: "Dance You Up," "Call Me (When You Need My Love)," "Now or Never," and  "It's Up To Me." Her performance on "Street Life" from the album Royal Jam with The Crusaders, B.B. King, and The London Philharmonic Orchestra, recorded live at Royal Festival Hall, was nominated for a Grammy.

Some of her performances include: The International Tribute for a Free South Africa for Nelson Mandela at London's Wembley Arena with George Duke, for an audience of 100,000 people and television audiences worldwide; The Hollywood Bowl as featured artist at the JVC Jazz Festival with guitarist Earl Klugh; several television appearances in England, such as the Jools Holland Show, Selena Scott, London's Jazz Café, and BBC's The One Show; and appearances at North Sea Jazz Festival, Laguna Beach's Festival of the Arts' series Pageant of the Masters, Tokyo Jazz Festival, The Iveagh Gardens, Dublin, Playboy Jazz Festival, Billboard Live, Dick Clark's American Bandstand, and the Jerry Lewis Telethon.

Early life 
James was born to Joseph and Ellen James in Los Angeles, California. Her debut performance was at age eight with her father's band at a grocery store opening. She sang "Poison Ivy" while holding her favorite doll. She attended Nevin Avenue Elementary School, participating in school plays and musicals and enrolling in dancing and acting classes at the Ross Snyders Recreation Center. After moving to Compton, James attended Vanguard Junior High School, where she participated in choir, chorus, and musicals including The King and I and Oklahoma! From there she went on to Centennial High School, where she organized dances, concerts, and events as vice president of the socialite "Tomahawk Club," participated in talent shows, and was voted Most Talented Senior Girl.

At age 18, after high school graduation, James, entered KGFJ's Soul Search Contest with "Somebody Loves You" by The Delfonics, winning fourth place out of 400 contestants, all of whom were professional musicians. Following this, James was approached by Motown Records, Barry White, and Wayne Henderson, but turned them down to attend college at California State Polytechnic University in Pomona, California. James received her Bachelor of Science in mass communications arts, with a focus on journalism, television production, radio programming, and announcing. While attending, James won grand prize winner First Place Best Female Solo in the Spring Sing talent contest for all four consecutive years.

Career

1975–1976: Patrice Rushen and Stevie Wonder 
James' career began in earnest in 1975, when Patrice Rushen wrote "What's the Story" for James to sing on her album Before the Dawn with Prestige Records.

In 1976, Stevie Wonder asked James to record "Another Star", the hit single from his album Songs in the Key of Life. The album reached #1 on Billboard's Top R&B/HipHop chart that year, and "Another Star" reached #2 on Billboard's Dance Club Songs chart. She went on to record on his albums Journey Through the Secret Life of Plants and Hotter Than July.

1977–2013: George Duke and more 
In 1977, James was recommended to George Duke by Leon "Ndugu" Chancler. James became lead vocalist and percussionist in the original George Duke Band, where she met band members Sheila E., Byron Miller, Sharon Muffy Hendrix, and Charles Icarus Johnson. In 1978, James recorded the album Don't Let Go, including the single "Moving On" with Napoleon Brock. The album reached #5 on Billboard charts. James continued to perform and record with Duke until his death in 2013. Her last recording with Duke was "Jazzmatazz" from Duke's final album Dreamweaver. In addition to Don't Let Go and Dreamweaver, James' other recordings with Duke include: Dukey Treats, Cool, Is Love Enough?, Illusions, Night After Night, 101 North, George Duke, Rendezvous, Follow the Rainbow, Master of the Game, and A Brazilian Love Affair.

In 1984, James sang vocals with Earth, Wind & Fire singer Philip Bailey on his albums Chinese Wall, featuring Phil Collins, and Triumph. James toured Japan with Bailey featuring James on lead vocals for UK single "Dance You Up."

In 1988, James recorded her first of three albums with Al Jarreau, with whom she continued to perform occasionally until his death.

In 1993, James sang backup vocals with Whitney Houston on The Bodyguard Tour.

1998–present: Burt Bacharach and later career 
James has toured with Burt Bacharach, who noticed her from her solo album Candles, from 1998 to the present day, including in the United States, the United Kingdom, Japan, Australia, New Zealand, Europe, South America, and Canada, where she has received several standing ovations for her rendition of Anyone Who Had a Heart. James headlined with the San Diego Symphony in 2014. James has recorded on Bacharach's albums Here I Am, At This Time, and Live at the Sydney Opera House with the Sydney Symphony Orchestra.

James has developed her career as a jazz vocalist with the Marlonius Jazz Orchestra (MJO). In 2019, James was featured with the orchestra five times - at the Festival of the Arts' series Pageant of the Masters in Laguna Beach, Feinstein's at Vitello's in March and July, and at the Blue Whale Jazz Club in October and March. James debuted with the MJO at a private ceremony at Ambassador Auditorium in 2016.

Solo work 
James has recorded several solo albums: Hit Factory, That Jazz, Candles, Morning Glow, Win Your Love, and Songcity. She has also recorded solo singles "Dance You Up," "Call Me (When You Need My Love), Now or Never, and It's Up to Me. Her solo work has been in close collaboration with co-writer, producer, vocalist, and multi-instrumentalist Nigel Martinez.

Discography 

* = lead vocals

References

External links 
 Josie James | Album Discography
 Josie James - Coming Back To Your Love

Year of birth missing (living people)
Living people
20th-century American women singers
20th-century American singers
American songwriters
21st-century American women